The Saxons were a group of Germanic peoples whose name was given in the early Middle Ages to a large country (Old Saxony) near the North Sea coast of northern Germania, in what is now Germany. In the late Roman Empire, the name was used to refer to Germanic coastal raiders, and in a similar sense to the later "Viking" (pirate or raider). Their origins are believed to be in or near the German North Sea coast where they appear later, in Carolingian times. In Merovingian times, continental Saxons had been associated with the activity and settlements on the coast of what later became Normandy. Their precise origins are uncertain, and they are sometimes described as fighting inland, coming into conflict with the Franks and Thuringians. There is possibly a single classical reference to a smaller homeland of an early Saxon tribe, but its interpretation is disputed. According to this proposal, the Saxons' earliest area of settlement is believed to have been Northern Albingia. This general area is close to the probable homeland of the Angles.

During the eighth and ninth centuries the Saxons of Old Saxony were in continual conflict with the Franks, whose kingdom at the time was ruled by the Carolingian dynasty. After thirty three years of conquest due to military campaigns led by the lord king and emperor Charlemagne beginning in 772 and ending around 804, the Franks defeated the Saxons, forced them to convert to Christianity and seized the territory of Old Saxony, annexing it into the Carolingian domain, although the Franks had been enemies of the Saxons in the time of Clovis I, during the early Merovingian period of the fifth and sixth centuries.

Charles Martel, Duke and prince of the Franks and Mayor of the Palace of Austrasia, the grandfather of Charlemagne, had fought and led numerous campaigns against the Saxons. 

In contrast, the English Saxons, today referred to in English as Anglo-Saxons, became a single nation bringing together migrant Germanic peoples (Frisians, Jutes, Angles [whence "English"]) and assimilated Celtic Britons populations. Their earliest weapons and clothing south of the Thames were based on late Roman military fashions, but later immigrants north of the Thames showed a stronger North German influence. The term "Anglo-Saxon", combining the names of the Angles and the Saxons, came into use by the eighth century (for example Paul the Deacon) to distinguish the Germanic inhabitants of Britain from continental Saxons (referred to in the Anglo-Saxon Chronicle as Ealdseaxe, 'old Saxons'), but both the Saxons of Britain and those of Old Saxony (Northern Germany) continued to be referred to as 'Saxons' in an indiscriminate manner, especially in the languages of Britain and Ireland.

Although the English Saxons were no longer raiders, the political history of the continental Saxons is unclear until the time of the conflict between their semi-legendary hero Widukind and the Frankish emperor Charlemagne. The continental Saxons are no longer a distinctive ethnic group or country but their name lives on in the names of several regions and states of Germany, including Lower Saxony (which includes central parts of the original Saxon homeland known as Old Saxony), Saxony in Upper Saxony, as well as Saxony-Anhalt (which includes Old, Lower and Upper Saxon regions).

Etymology

The name of the Saxons may derive from a kind of knife associated with the ethnos; such a knife has the name seax in Old English, Sax in German, sachs in Old High German, and sax in Old Norse. The seax has had a lasting symbolic impact in the English counties of Essex and Middlesex, both of which feature three seaxes in their ceremonial emblem. The names of these counties, along with the names "Sussex" and "Wessex", contain a remnant of the root of the word "Saxon".

The Elizabethan-era play Edmund Ironside suggests that the name "Saxon" derives from the Latin saxa (stones; singular form: saxum):

Saxon as a demonym

Celtic languages
In the Celtic languages, the words designating English nationality derive from the Latin word . The most prominent example, a loanword in English from Scottish Gaelic, is the word , used by Scots-, Scottish English- and Gaelic-speakers in the 21st century as a racially pejorative term for an English person. The Oxford English Dictionary (OED) gives 1771 as the date of the earliest written use of the word in English.

Cornish terms the English , from the same derivation. In the 16th century Cornish-speakers used the phrase  to feign ignorance of the English language.

Romance languages
The label "Saxons" (in ) also became attached to German settlers who settled during the 12th century in southeastern Transylvania. From Transylvania, some of these Saxons migrated to neighbouring Moldavia, as the name of the town  shows. Sascut lies in the part of Moldavia that forms part of present-day Romania.

During George Frideric Handel's visit to the Republic of Venice (1706–09), much was made of his origins in Saxony; in particular, the Venetians greeted the 1709 performance of his opera Agrippina with the cry , "Cheers for the beloved Saxon!"

Non-Indo-European languages
The Finnish word  (scissors) reflects the name of the old Saxon single-edged sword — seax — from which the name "Saxon" supposedly derives. In Estonian,  means "a nobleman" or, colloquially, "a wealthy or powerful person". As a result of the 13th-century Northern Crusades, Estonia's upper class comprised mostly persons of German origin until well into the 20th century.

Related personal names
The Dutch female given name, originally meant 'a Saxon woman' (metathesis of Saxia).

Saxony as a toponym
Following the downfall of Henry the Lion (11291195, Duke of Saxony 11421180), and the subsequent splitting of the Saxon tribal duchy into several territories, the name of the Saxon duchy was transferred to the lands of the Ascanian family. This led to the differentiation between Lower Saxony (lands settled by the Saxon tribe) and Upper Saxony (the lands belonging to the House of Wettin). Gradually, the latter region became known as "Saxony", ultimately usurping the name's original geographical meaning. The area formerly known as Upper Saxony now lies in Central Germany - in the eastern part of the present-day Federal Republic of Germany: note the names of the federal states of Saxony and Saxony-Anhalt.

History

Early history

Ptolemy's Geographia, written in the second century, is sometimes considered to contain the first mentioning of the Saxons. Some copies of this text mention a tribe called Saxones in the area to the north of the lower Elbe. However, other versions refer to the same tribe as Axones. This may be a misspelling of the tribe that Tacitus in his Germania called Aviones. According to this theory, "Saxones" was the result of later scribes trying to correct a name that meant nothing to them. On the other hand, Schütte, in his analysis of such problems in Ptolemy's Maps of Northern Europe, believed that "Saxones" is correct. He notes that the loss of first letters occurs in numerous places in various copies of Ptolemy's work, and also that the manuscripts without "Saxones" are generally inferior overall.

Schütte remarks that there was a medieval tradition of calling this area "Old Saxony" (covering Westphalia, Angria and Eastphalia). This view is in line with Bede who mentions Old Saxony was near the Rhine, somewhere to the north of the river Lippe (Westphalia, northeastern part of modern German state Nordrhein-Westfalen).

The first undisputed mention of the Saxon name in its modern form is from AD 356, when Julian, later the Roman emperor, mentioned them in a speech as allies of Magnentius, a rival emperor in Gaul. Zosimus mentions a specific tribe of Saxons, called the Kouadoi, which have been interpreted as a misunderstanding for the Chauci, or Chamavi. They entered the Rhineland and displaced the recently settled Salian Franks from Batavi, whereupon some of the Salians began to move into the Belgian territory of Toxandria, supported by Julian.

Both in this case and in others the Saxons were associated with using boats for their raids. In order to defend against Saxon raiders, the Romans created a military district called the Litus Saxonicum ("Saxon Shore") on both sides of the English Channel.

In 441–442 AD, Saxons are mentioned for the first time as inhabitants of Britain, when an unknown Gaulish historian wrote: "The British provinces (...) have been reduced to Saxon rule".

Saxons as inhabitants of present-day Northern Germany are first mentioned in 555, when the Frankish king Theudebald died, and the Saxons used the opportunity for an uprising. The uprising was suppressed by Chlothar I, Theudebald's successor. Some of their Frankish successors fought against the Saxons, others were allied with them. The Thuringians frequently appeared as allies of the Saxons.

Netherlands
In the Netherlands, Saxons occupied the territory south of the Frisians and north of the Franks. In the west it reached as far as the Gooi region, in the south as far as the Lower Rhine. After the conquest of Charlemagne, this area formed the main part of the Bishopric of Utrecht. The Saxon duchy of Hamaland played an important role in the formation of the duchy of Guelders.

The local language, although strongly influenced by standard Dutch, is still officially recognised as Dutch Low Saxon.

Italy and Provence
In 569, some Saxons accompanied the Lombards into Italy under the leadership of Alboin and settled there. In 572, they raided southeastern Gaul as far as Stablo, now Estoublon. Divided, they were easily defeated by the Gallo-Roman general Mummolus. When the Saxons regrouped, a peace treaty was negotiated whereby the Italian Saxons were allowed to settle with their families in Austrasia. Gathering their families and belongings in Italy, they returned to Provence in two groups in 573. One group proceeded by way of Nice and another via Embrun, joining up at Avignon. They plundered the territory and were as a consequence stopped from crossing the Rhône by Mummolus. They were forced to pay compensation for what they had robbed before they could enter Austrasia. These people are known only by documents, and their settlement cannot be compared to the archeological artifacts and remains that attest to Saxon settlements in northern and western Gaul.

Gaul 

A Saxon king named Eadwacer conquered Angers in 463, to be dislodged by Childeric I and the Salian Franks, allies of the Roman Empire. It is possible that Saxon settlement of Great Britain began in response to expanding Frankish control of the Channel coast.

Some Saxons already lived along the Saxon shore of Gaul as Roman foederati. They can be traced in documents, but also in archeology and in toponymy. The Notitia Dignitatum mentions the Tribunus cohortis primae novae Armoricanae, Grannona in litore Saxonico. The location of Grannona is uncertain and was identified by the historians and toponymists at different places: mainly with the town known today as Granville (in Normandy) or nearby. The Notitia Dignitatum does not explain where these "Roman" soldiers came from. Some toponymists have proposed Graignes (Grania 1109–1113) as the location for Grannona/Grannonum. Although some scholars believe it could be the same element *gran, that is recognised in Guernsey (Greneroi 11th century), it most likely derives from the Gaulish god Grannos. This location is closer to Bayeux, where Gregory of Tours evokes otherwise the Saxones Bajocassini (Bessin Saxons), which were ineffective against the Breton Waroch II in 579.

A Saxon unit of laeti settled at Bayeuxthe Saxones Baiocassenses. These Saxons became subjects of Clovis I late in the fifth century. The Saxons of Bayeux comprised a standing army and were often called upon to serve alongside the local levy of their region in Merovingian military campaigns. In 589, the Saxons wore their hair in the Breton fashion at the orders of Fredegund and fought with them as allies against Guntram. Beginning in 626, the Saxons of the Bessin were used by Dagobert I for his campaigns against the Basques. One of their own, Aeghyna, was created a dux over the region of Vasconia.

In 843 and 846 under king Charles the Bald, other official documents mention a pagus called Otlinga Saxonia in the Bessin region, but the meaning of Otlinga is unclear. Different Bessin toponyms were identified as typically Saxon, ex : Cottun (Coltun 1035–1037 ; Colas "town"). It is the only place name in Normandy that can be interpreted as a -tun one (English -ton; cf. Colton). In contrast to this one example in Normandy are numerous -thun villages in the north of France, in Boulonnais, for example Alincthun, Verlincthun, and Pelingthun, showing, with other toponyms, an important Saxon or Anglo-Saxon settlement. Comparing the concentration of -ham/-hem (Anglo-Saxon hām > home) toponyms in the Bessin and in the Boulonnais gives more examples of Saxon settlement. In the area known today as Normandy, the -ham cases of Bessin are uniquethey do not exist elsewhere. Other cases were considered, but there is no determining example. For example, Canehan (Kenehan 1030/Canaan 1030–1035) could be the biblical name Canaan or Airan (Heidram 9th century), the Germanic masculine name Hairammus.

The Bessin examples are clear; for example, Ouistreham (Oistreham 1086), Étréham (Oesterham 1350 ?), Huppain (*Hubbehain ; Hubbas "home"), and Surrain (Surrehain 11thcentury). Another significant example can be found in the Norman onomastics: the widespread surname Lecesne, with variant spellings: LeCesne, Lesène, Lecène, and Cesne. It comes from Gallo-Romance *SAXINU "the Saxon", which is saisne in Old French. These examples are not derived from more recent Anglo-Scandinavian toponyms, because in that case they would have been numerous in the Norman regions (pays deCaux, Basse-Seine, North-Cotentin) settled by Germanic peoples. That is not the case, nor does Bessin belong to the pagii, which were affected by an important wave of Anglo-Scandinavian immigration.

In addition, archaeological finds add evidence to the documents and the results of toponymic research. Around the city of Caen and in the Bessin (Vierville-sur-Mer, Bénouville, Giverville, Hérouvillette), excavations have yielded numerous examples of Anglo-Saxon jewellery, design elements, settings, and weapons. All of these things were discovered in cemeteries in a context of the fifth, sixth and seventh centuries AD.

The oldest Saxon site found in France to date is Vron, in Picardy. Archaeologists excavated a large cemetery with tombs dating from the Roman Empire until the sixth century. Furniture and other grave goods, as well as the human remains, revealed a group of people buried in the fourth and fifth centuries AD. Physically different from the usual local inhabitants found before this period, they instead resembled the Germanic populations of the north. Starting around 375 AD the burials are located in the region known in Roman times as the Saxon Shores. 92% of these burials were inhumations, and sometimes included weapons of typical Germanic type. Starting from around 440 AD the burial ground displaced eastward. The burials were now arranged in rows and displayed a strong Anglo-Saxon influence until around 520 AD, when this influence subsided. Archaeological material, neighbouring toponymy, and historical accounts support the conclusion of settlement of Saxon foederati with their families on the shores of the English Channel. Further anthropological research by Joël Blondiaux shows these people were from Lower Saxony.

Saxons in Britain

Saxons, along with Angles, Frisians and Jutes, invaded or migrated to the island of Great Britain (Britannia) around the time of the collapse of the Western Roman Empire. Saxon raiders had been harassing the eastern and southern shores of Britannia for centuries before, prompting the construction of a string of coastal forts called the Litora Saxonica or Saxon Shore. Before the end of Roman rule in Britannia, many Saxons and other folk had been permitted to settle in these areas as farmers.

According to tradition, the Saxons (and other tribes) first entered Britain en masse as part of an agreement to protect the Britons from the incursions of the Picts, Gaels and others. The story, as reported in such sources as the Historia Brittonum and Gildas, indicates that the British king Vortigern allowed the Germanic warlords, later named as Hengist and Horsa by Bede, to settle their people on the Isle of Thanet in exchange for their service as mercenaries. According to Bede, Hengist manipulated Vortigern into granting more land and allowing for more settlers to come in, paving the way for the Germanic settlement of Britain.

Historians are divided about what followed: some argue that the takeover of southern Great Britain by the Anglo-Saxons was peaceful. The known account from a native Briton who lived in the mid-5th century AD, Gildas, described events as a forced takeover by armed attack:

Gildas described how the Saxons were later slaughtered at the battle of Mons Badonicus 44 years before he wrote his history, and their conquest of Britain halted. The eighth-century English historian Bede tells how their advance resumed thereafter. He said this resulted in a swift overrunning of the entirety of South-Eastern Britain, and the foundation of the Anglo-Saxon kingdoms.

Four separate Saxon realms emerged:
 East Saxons: created the Kingdom of Essex.
 Middle Saxons: created the province of Middlesex
 South Saxons: led by Aelle, created the Kingdom of Sussex
 West Saxons: created the Kingdom of Wessex

During the period of the reigns from Egbert to Alfred the Great, the kings of Wessex emerged as Bretwalda, unifying the country. They eventually organised it as the kingdom of England in the face of Viking invasions.

Later Saxons in Germany

The continental Saxons living in what was known as Old Saxony (c. 531–804) appear to have become consolidated by the end of the eighth century. After subjugation by the Emperor Charlemagne, a political entity called the Duchy of Saxony (804-1296) appeared, covering Westphalia, Eastphalia, Angria and Nordalbingia (Holstein, southern part of modern-day Schleswig-Holstein state).

The Saxons long resisted becoming Christians and being incorporated into the orbit of the Frankish kingdom. In 776 the Saxons promised to convert to Christianity and vow loyalty to the king, but, during Charlemagne's campaign in Hispania (778), the Saxons advanced to Deutz on the Rhine and plundered along the river. This was an oft-repeated pattern when Charlemagne was distracted by other matters.
They were conquered by Charlemagne in a long series of annual campaigns, the Saxon Wars (772804). With defeat came enforced baptism and conversion as well as the union of the Saxons with the rest of the Germanic, Frankish empire. Their sacred tree or pillar, a symbol of Irminsul, was destroyed. Charlemagne deported 10,000 Nordalbingian Saxons to Neustria and gave their largely vacant lands in Wagria (approximately modern Plön and Ostholstein districts) to the loyal king of the Abotrites. Einhard, Charlemagne's biographer, says on the closing of this grand conflict:
The war that had lasted so many years was at length ended by their acceding to the terms offered by the king; which were renunciation of their national religious customs and the worship of devils, acceptance of the sacraments of the Christian faith and religion, and union with the Franks to form one people.

Under Carolingian rule, the Saxons were reduced to tributary status. There is evidence that the Saxons, as well as Slavic tributaries such as the Abodrites and the Wends, often provided troops to their Carolingian overlords. The dukes of Saxony became kings (Henry I, the Fowler, 919) and later the first emperors (Henry's son, Otto I, the Great) of Germany during the tenth century, but they lost this position in 1024. The duchy was divided in 1180 when Duke Henry the Lion refused to follow his cousin, Emperor Frederick Barbarossa, into war in Lombardy.

During the High Middle Ages, under the Salian emperors and, later, under the Teutonic Knights, German settlers moved east of the Saale into the area of a western Slavic tribe, the Sorbs. The Sorbs were gradually Germanised. This region subsequently acquired the name Saxony through political circumstances, though it was initially called the March of Meissen. The rulers of Meissen acquired control of the Duchy of Saxe-Wittenberg (only a remnant of the previous Duchy) in 1423; they eventually applied the name Saxony to the whole of their kingdom. Since then, this part of eastern Germany has been referred to as Saxony, a source of some misunderstanding about the original homeland of the Saxons, with a central part in the present-day German state of Lower Saxony.

Culture

Social structure
Bede, a Northumbrian writing around the year 730, remarks that "the old (that is, the continental) Saxons have no king, but they are governed by several ealdormen (or satrapa) who, during war, cast lots for leadership but who, in time of peace, are equal in power." The regnum Saxonum was divided into three provinces – Westphalia, Eastphalia and Angria – which comprised about one hundred pagi or Gaue. Each Gau had its own satrap with enough military power to level whole villages that opposed him.

In the mid-9th century, Nithard first described the social structure of the Saxons beneath their leaders. The caste structure was rigid; in the Saxon language the three castes, excluding slaves, were called the edhilingui (related to the term aetheling), frilingi and lazzi. These terms were subsequently Latinised as nobiles or nobiliores; ingenui, ingenuiles or liberi; and liberti, liti or serviles. According to very early traditions that are presumed to contain a good deal of historical truth, the edhilingui were the descendants of the Saxons who led the tribe out of Holstein and during the migrations of the sixth century. They were a conquering warrior elite. The frilingi represented the descendants of the amicii, auxiliarii and manumissi of that caste. The lazzi represented the descendants of the original inhabitants of the conquered territories, who were forced to make oaths of submission and pay tribute to the edhilingui.

The Lex Saxonum regulated the Saxons' unusual society. Intermarriage between the castes was forbidden by the Lex, and wergilds were set based upon caste membership. The edhilingui were worth 1,440 solidi, or about 700 head of cattle, the highest wergild on the continent; the price of a bride was also very high. This was six times as much as that of the frilingi and eight times as much as the lazzi. The gulf between noble and ignoble was very large, but the difference between a freeman and an indentured labourer was small.

According to the Vita Lebuini antiqua, an important source for early Saxon history, the Saxons held an annual council at Marklo (Westphalia) where they "confirmed their laws, gave judgment on outstanding cases, and determined by common counsel whether they would go to war or be in peace that year." All three castes participated in the general council; twelve representatives from each caste were sent from each Gau. In 782, Charlemagne abolished the system of Gaue and replaced it with the Grafschaftsverfassung, the system of counties typical of Francia. By prohibiting the Marklo councils, Charlemagne pushed the frilingi and lazzi out of political power. The old Saxon system of Abgabengrundherrschaft, lordship based on dues and taxes, was replaced by a form of feudalism based on service and labour, personal relationships and oaths.

Religion

Germanic Religion

Saxon religious practices were closely related to their political practices. The annual councils of the entire tribe began with invocations of the gods. The procedure by which dukes were elected in wartime, by drawing lots, is presumed to have had religious significance, i.e. in giving trust to divine providenceit seemsto guide the random decision making. There were also sacred rituals and objects, such as the pillars called Irminsul; these were believed to connect heaven and earth, as with other examples of trees or ladders to heaven in numerous religions. Charlemagne had one such pillar chopped down in 772 close to the Eresburg stronghold.

Early Saxon religious practices in Britain can be gleaned from place names and the Germanic calendar in use at that time. The Germanic gods Woden, Frigg, Tiw and Thunor, who are attested to in every Germanic tradition, were worshipped in Wessex, Sussex and Essex. They are the only ones directly attested to, though the names of the third and fourth months (March and April) of the Old English calendar bear the names Hrethmonath and Eosturmonath, meaning "month of Hretha" and "month of Ēostre." It is presumed that these are the names of two goddesses who were worshipped around that season. The Saxons offered cakes to their gods in February (Solmonath). There was a religious festival associated with the harvest, Halegmonath ("holy month" or "month of offerings", September). The Saxon calendar began on 25 December, and the months of December and January were called Yule (or Giuli). They contained a Modra niht or "night of the mothers", another religious festival of unknown content.

The Saxon freemen and servile class remained faithful to their original beliefs long after their nominal conversion to Christianity. Nursing a hatred of the upper class, which, with Frankish assistance, had marginalised them from political power, the lower classes (the plebeium vulgus or cives) were a problem for Christian authorities as late as 836. The Translatio S.Liborii remarks on their obstinacy in pagan ritus et superstitio (usage and superstition).

Christianity

The conversion of the Saxons in England from their original Germanic religion to Christianity occurred in the early to late seventh century under the influence of the already converted Jutes of Kent. In the 630s, Birinus became the "apostle to the West Saxons" and converted Wessex, whose first Christian king was Cynegils. The West Saxons begin to emerge from obscurity only with their conversion to Christianity and keeping written records. The Gewisse, a West Saxon people, were especially resistant to Christianity; Birinus exercised more efforts against them and ultimately succeeded in conversion. In Wessex, a bishopric was founded at Dorchester. The South Saxons were first evangelised extensively under Anglian influence; Aethelwalh of Sussex was converted by Wulfhere, King of Mercia and allowed Wilfrid, Bishop of York, to evangelise his people beginning in 681. The chief South Saxon bishopric was that of Selsey. The East Saxons were more pagan than the southern or western Saxons; their territory had a superabundance of pagan sites. Their king, Saeberht, was converted early and a diocese was established at London. Its first bishop, Mellitus, was expelled by Saeberht's heirs. The conversion of the East Saxons was completed under Cedd in the 650s and 660s.

The continental Saxons were evangelised largely by English missionaries in the late seventh and early eighth centuries. Around 695, two early English missionaries, Hewald the White and Hewald the Black, were martyred by the vicani, that is, villagers. Throughout the century that followed, villagers and other peasants proved to be the greatest opponents of Christianisation, while missionaries often received the support of the edhilingui and other noblemen. Saint Lebuin, an Englishman who between 745 and 770 preached to the Saxons, mainly in the eastern Netherlands, built a church and made many friends among the nobility. Some of them rallied to save him from an angry mob at the annual council at Marklo (near river Weser, Bremen). Social tensions arose between the Christianity-sympathetic noblemen and the pagan lower castes, who were staunchly faithful to their traditional religion.

Under Charlemagne, the Saxon Wars had as their chief object the conversion and integration of the Saxons into the Frankish empire. Though much of the highest caste converted readily, forced baptisms and forced tithing made enemies of the lower orders. Even some contemporaries found the methods employed to win over the Saxons wanting, as this excerpt from a letter of Alcuin of York to his friend Meginfrid, written in 796, shows:
If the light yoke and sweet burden of Christ were to be preached to the most obstinate people of the Saxons with as much determination as the payment of tithes has been exacted, or as the force of the legal decree has been applied for fault of the most trifling sort imaginable, perhaps they would not be averse to their baptismal vows.

Charlemagne's successor, Louis the Pious, reportedly treated the Saxons more as Alcuin would have wished, and as a consequence they were faithful subjects. The lower classes, however, revolted against Frankish overlordship in favour of their old paganism as late as the 840s, when the Stellinga rose up against the Saxon leadership, who were allied with the Frankish emperor Lothair I. After the suppression of the Stellinga, in 851 Louis the German brought relics from Rome to Saxony to foster a devotion to the Roman Catholic Church. The Poeta Saxo, in his verse Annales of Charlemagne's reign (written between 888 and 891), laid an emphasis on his conquest of Saxony. He celebrated the Frankish monarch as on par with the Roman emperors and as the bringer of Christian salvation to people. References are made to periodic outbreaks of pagan worship, especially of Freya, among the Saxon peasantry as late as the 12th century.

Christian literature
In the ninth century, the Saxon nobility became vigorous supporters of monasticism and formed a bulwark of Christianity against the existing Slavic paganism to the east and the Nordic paganism of the Vikings to the north. Much Christian literature was produced in the vernacular Old Saxon, the notable ones being a result of the literary output and wide influence of Saxon monasteries such as Fulda, Corvey and Verden; and the theological controversy between the Augustinian, Gottschalk and Rabanus Maurus.

From an early date, Charlemagne and Louis the Pious supported Christian vernacular works in order to evangelise the Saxons more efficiently. The Heliand, a verse epic of the life of Christ in a Germanic setting, and Genesis, another epic retelling of the events of the first book of the Bible, were commissioned in the early ninth century by Louis to disseminate scriptural knowledge to the masses. A council of Tours in 813 and then a synod of Mainz in 848 both declared that homilies ought to be preached in the vernacular. The earliest preserved text in the Saxon language is a baptismal vow from the late eighth or early ninth century; the vernacular was used extensively in an effort to Christianise the lowest castes of Saxon society.

See also
 List of Germanic tribes

Notes

References
 Bachrach, Bernard S. Merovingian Military Organisation, 481–751. Minneapolis: University of Minnesota Press, 1971.
 Goldberg, Eric J. "Popular Revolt, Dynastic Politics, and Aristocratic Factionalism in the Early Middle Ages: The Saxon Stellinga Reconsidered." Speculum, Vol. 70, No. 3. (Jul., 1995), pp. 467–501.
 Hummer, Hans J. Politics and Power in Early Medieval Europe: Alsace and the Frankish Realm 600–1000. Cambridge University Press: 2005.
 Reuter, Timothy. Germany in the Early Middle Ages 800–1056. New York: Longman, 1991.
 Reuter, Timothy (trans.) The Annals of Fulda. (Manchester Medieval series, Ninth-Century Histories, Volume II.) Manchester: Manchester University Press, 1992.

 Stenton, Sir Frank M. Anglo-Saxon England. third ed. Oxford University Press, 1971.
 Wallace-Hadrill, J. M., translator. The Fourth Book of the Chronicle of Fredegar with its Continuations. Connecticut: Greenwood Press, 1960.
 Thompson, James Westfall. Feudal Germany. 2 vol. New York: Frederick Ungar Publishing Co., 1928.

External links
 James Grout: Saxon Advent, part of the Encyclopædia Romana
 Saxons and Britons
 

 
History of North Rhine-Westphalia
Early Germanic peoples
German tribes
Ingaevones